Daganbhuiyan is an upazila of Feni District in the Division of Chittagong, Bangladesh.

Geography
It has 34750 households and a total area of 165.84 km2.

Demographics
According to the 1991 Bangladesh census, Dagonbhuiyan then had a population of 204, 975. Males constituted 49.4% of the population, and females 50.6%. The population aged 18 or over was 95, 809. Dagonbhuiyan had an average literacy rate of 70% (7+ years), against the national average of 32.4%.

Administration
Daganbhuiyan Upazila is divided into Daganbhuiyan Municipality and eight union parishads: Daganbhuiyan, Jayloskor, Matubhuiyan, Purba Chandrapur, Rajapur, Ramnagar, Sindurpur, and Yeakubpur. The union parishads are subdivided into 101 mauzas and 119 villages.Daganbhuiyan Municipality is subdivided into 9 wards and 20 mahallas.

Public Representative
Parliamentary Seats

Upazila Parishad and administration

Notable people
 Abdus Salam, martyr of the Bengali Language Movement
 Rahimullah Choudhury, industrialist and politician
 Zahur Hossain Chowdhury, journalist and politician
 Abdul Awal Mintoo, industrialist

See also
 Upazilas of Bangladesh
 Districts of Bangladesh
 Divisions of Bangladesh

References

 
Upazilas of Feni District